Highway Gothic (formally known as the FHWA Series fonts or the Standard Alphabets for Highway Signs) is a sans-serif typeface developed by the United States Federal Highway Administration (FHWA) and used for road signage in the Americas, including the U.S., Canada, Latin America and some Caribbean countries, as well as in Asian countries influenced by American signage practices, including the Philippines, China, Taiwan, Malaysia, Indonesia and Thailand. Variants, major and minor, but not the exact U.S. typeface, are used in countries like Turkey, Mexico, Australia (AS1744 fonts), Spain, the Netherlands, Brazil, New Zealand, Macau (written in Portuguese), and some signs in countries like India and Saudi Arabia, when written in English. The typefaces were developed to maximize legibility at a distance and at high speed. Computer typeface versions, known as Highway Gothic or Interstate, a separate typeface, which are for sale to the general public, include punctuation marks based on a rectangular shape. However, on signage, the official FHWA Series punctuation is based on a circular shape.

The typeface consists of six fonts: "A" (the narrowest), "B", "C", "D", "E", "E(M)" (a modified version of "E" with wider strokes), and "F" (the widest). The typeface originally included only uppercase letters, with the exception of "E(M)", which was used on large expressway and freeway guide signs.

History
The typefaces are officially defined by the FHWA's Standard Alphabets for Traffic-Control Devices, originally published in 1948, reprinted 1952. Changes to the specifications were published in 1966, 1977, and 2000. The 2000 specifications differ from earlier versions in the shapes of a few letters and in the inclusion of lowercase letters for all alphabet series.

FHWA Series A through F were developed by the Public Roads Administration (which later became FHWA) during World War II. Draft versions of these typefaces were used in 1942 for signs on the Pentagon road network. Between 1949 and 1950, as part of a research program into freeway signing carried out by the California Department of Transportation (Caltrans), Series E Modified was developed from Series E by thickening the stroke width to accommodate button reflectors for ground-mounted signs, while a lowercase alphabet was developed to allow mixed-case legend (consisting initially of Series D and lowercase letters) to be used on externally illuminated overhead signs. The lowercase letters, paired with Series E Modified, later became the basis of a national standard for mixed-case legend on freeway guide signs with the 1958 publication of the American Association of State Highway and Transportation Officials (AASHTO) signing and marking manual for Interstate Highways.

Series "A" has been officially discontinued in the United States due to poor legibility at high speeds, though it continues to be specified for certain signs in New Zealand. In 2004, the FHWA published lowercase letters for all of the typefaces and made changes to the Manual on Uniform Traffic Control Devices, which allows their use.

There was an expectation that over the next few decades, the new Clearview typeface, also specifically developed for use on traffic signs, would replace the FHWA series on some new signage. However, the FHWA announced in 2016 that it was rescinding its 2004 interim approval of Clearview in the United States; while existing Clearview signs could stay up, new signs would have to go back to using Highway Gothic. On June 7, 2016, a bill challenging this decision was introduced in the United States House of Representatives, which would have ordered the FHWA to reinstate the interim approval for Clearview. This bill passed as part of the Consolidated Appropriations Act, 2018. The Federal Highway Administration makes no recommendation or endorsement of the Clearview typeface with the reinstatement of their 2004 interim approval.

Tobias Frere-Jones designed the typeface Interstate, based on the FHWA series, during the 1990s. Overpass is an open-source replacement for Interstate commissioned by Red Hat. PBS previously used a custom derivative, "PBS Explorer".

In 2001, URW++ released the SAA Series typeface, a digitized version of the early FHWA Series typeface.

Greece-based Parachute Type Foundry designed the PF Grand Gothik Variable typeface, which also based on the FHWA Series typeface, with OpenType features.

Parachute Type Foundry also designed the PF Highway Sans typeface, which also based on the FHWA Series typeface.

Tom Oetken designed the free-to-download for commercial and personal use Traffic typeface, which also based on the FHWA Series typeface.

Otherwhere Collective designed the Highway VAR variable typeface, which also based on the FHWA typeface.

Usage

United States

Typically, one- or two-digit Interstate, U.S. Highway, and U.S. state route signs use the Series D font for the numbers, while signs with three or more digits use either a narrower font (Series B or C) or have smaller numbers in the Series D font. Series E and F is most commonly used on U.S. speed limit signs, although older signs often use narrower fonts. Street name signs usually feature white Series B, C or D letters (which may either have all capital letters or a combination of capital and lowercase letters) on a green background (which can also be substituted for other colors, such as blue or brown); freeway guide signs use Series E(M) on said backgrounds. On white (regulatory), orange (construction) and yellow (warning) signs, black letters and numbers are used instead. Georgia uses both Series C and D fonts for the Interstate Highway signs until 2012. Beginning in 2016 when the interim approval for Clearview was rescinded, the Arizona Department of Transportation is now using mixed case (non-Modified) Series E for freeway guide signage, mixed case Series D for guide signage on non-freeway roads, and mixed case Series C for street name signs.

By the mid-1990s the FHWA series of typefaces was used as a source of inspiration for a multi-weight print typeface designed by Tobias Frere-Jones of Font Bureau. Frere-Jones made accommodations for smaller print reproduction and Font Bureau released the face under the name Interstate. It has been adopted by many companies for branding; for example, NBC used it for NBC Sports graphics packages from 1997 to 2006, and TV Guide uses the typeface on its cover. Also, The Weather Channel utilized this typeface extensively, both on its weather maps and for its local forecasts. The logo of the premium cable channel Epix also uses a lowercase version of this typeface. NESN uses this typeface for on-screen graphics. The New York Mets use this typeface at Citi Field. The gossip magazine InTouch has been using this typeface since 2012. Films such as 8 Mile also use this font. Entertainment Tonight has been using this typeface since its 34th season. The soft drink Sierra Mist used this font on its logo from 2010 to 2014. It was also used in most Hannaford stores. Gridlock!, a pricing game on the American game show The Price Is Right in which the contestant can win a car, also uses the font in its logo and price displays.

Worldwide

The FHWA typefaces are also used predominantly on road signs in Canada. The province of Ontario used an in-house modified version until the late 1980s that featured slightly different characteristics, such as flat-top numeral 3's and numeral 1's without a serif. The city of Windsor began replacing its Helvetica signs with Highway Gothic in 2018. Peru (under different series labels), Australia (under the Australian Standard AS1744-1975 typeface), New Zealand, Indonesia, Malaysia, Mexico and other countries use Highway Gothic. Still others use typefaces that are either derived directly from the FHWA series or very similar in appearance. There are a few of them in South Africa, Lesotho, Colombia, the Philippines, and Thailand.

In Portugal, a variant of Highway Gothic—the Rodoviária typeface—was used on road signs since the 1970s until the introduction of a new signage model in 1994–1998. It is still used in the road signs of Macau.

In Argentina, new road signs based on the  recently used the FHWA typeface.

In India, the FHWA typeface used for highway shields only while Transport used for road signs.

In mainland China, newer roadsigns use the FHWA typeface alongside Helvetica for alphanumeric text.

In Taiwan, the former FHWA Series E and the recent Arial are also used for English text.

Indonesia formerly used the typeface from 1993 until 2014, regulated by Ministry of Transportation's law No. 62 year 1993. However, in 2014, Ministry of Transportation passed a regulation to introduce new road signs, being replaced with the new Clearview typeface.

In Spain, Series E is the base for Autopista typeface, used on Spanish motorways and freeways (Autopistas/ Autovias).

The Netherlands uses a derivative of the FHWA Alphabet Series typeface designed by the ANWB and the Dutch highways and waterways authority. The original set included two of the six series in the original typeface—RWS-Ee (wide, based on Series E (M)) and RWS-Cc (narrow, based on Series C) or ANWB-Ee (regular) and ANWB-Cc (condensed). Since 1997 the signs placed by the ANWB have used a new font called ANWB-Uu. Signs of other manufacturers continued using the old fonts. Since 2015 the ANWB-Uu font is not used any more on new signs; it has been replaced by RWS-Ee and the newly-designed RWS-Dd (based on the FHWA series D).

The Interstate typeface, clearly inspired by Highway Gothic, designed by Tobias Frere-Jones, has been used by various companies for signs and other graphic design elements. Examples include the United Kingdom, where the font has been adopted for signage by companies such as supermarket Sainsbury's and railway company c2c. In Russia, Channel One used this font for its clock ident from 1996 to 2000.

Samples
FHWA Series B

FHWA Series C

FHWA Series D

FHWA Series E

FHWA Series F

See also
List of public signage typefaces
 Typefaces used on North American traffic signs

References

External links
Standard Alphabets for Traffic Control Devices from the United States Federal Highway Administration (PDF)
Sign Typefaces from the Manual of Traffic Signs

Sans-serif typefaces
Government typefaces
Traffic signs
Federal Highway Administration
Typefaces and fonts introduced in 1948
Road signs in the United States